

Arthropods

Insects

Dinosaurs

Newly named dinosaurs

See also

References

1850s in paleontology
Paleontology